Proexochokefalos (meaning "big head with big tuberosities") is an extinct genus of machimosaurid teleosauroid from the Jurassic of France

Classification
 
The type species, S. heberti, was originally named "Steneosaurus" heberti by Morel de Glasville in 1876 from a complete skull and mandible (MNHN.F ) found in the Callovian aged Marnes de Dives near Villers-sur-mer in the Calvados department of Normandy, France.   Steneosaurus depressus is a junior synonym. Another species referred to the genus, Proexochokefalos cf. bouchardi is known from remains from the Calcaire de Caen, France, and Reuchenette Formation, Switzerland.

References 

Thalattosuchians
Callovian life
Oxfordian life
Kimmeridgian life
Late Jurassic reptiles of Europe
Middle Jurassic reptiles of Europe
Jurassic France
Fossils of France
Jurassic Switzerland
Fossils of Switzerland
Fossil taxa described in 2020
Prehistoric pseudosuchian genera